Donald Young was the defending champion; however, he was eliminated by Marinko Matosevic in the semifinals.
Matosevic won in the final match 2–6, 6–4, 6–3, against Ryan Sweeting.

Seeds

Draw

Finals

Top half

Bottom half

References
 Main Draw
 Qualifying Draw

2010 ATP Challenger Tour
2010,Singles